This is a list of colleges and universities in the U.S. state of New Hampshire. For the purposes of this list, colleges and universities are defined as accredited, degree-granting, postsecondary institutions. Currently, there are several universities and one law school, as well as a number of undergraduate associates and baccalaureate colleges, operating in the state. In addition, four out-of-state institutions offer courses and degrees at locations in New Hampshire, and fifteen academic institutions were formerly active in the state.

The state's five public universities are administered by the University System of New Hampshire, which is the largest provider of postsecondary education in the state. New Hampshire is also served by a network of seven public, technical community colleges. The oldest school in the state is Dartmouth College, a member of the Ivy League and the only New Hampshire institution founded before the American Revolution. Enrollment sizes range from small liberal arts colleges with fewer than 100 students to the flagship state school, the University of New Hampshire in Durham, which has over 14,000 on-campus students.

The New Hampshire College & University Council is a consortium of 21 of the state's public and private institutions of higher education.

The active institutions included on this list are all accredited by the New England Association of Schools and Colleges (NEASC), with the exception of Antioch University New England, which is accredited by the North Central Association of Schools and Colleges and the Higher Learning Commission.

Extant institutions

Defunct institutions

Out-of-state institutions
MCPHS University of Massachusetts offers a Doctor of Pharmacy, Master of Physician Assistant Studies, Master of Science in Occupational Therapy, Master of Science in Nursing, and a post-baccalaureate Bachelor of Science in Nursing at its location in Manchester.

See also
 Higher education in the United States
 List of college athletic programs in New Hampshire
 List of recognized higher education accreditation organizations
 Lists of American institutions of higher education
 Lists of universities and colleges
 Lists of universities and colleges by country

Notes

One institution, St. Joseph School of Nursing, is listed by the New Hampshire Postsecondary Education Commission as approved to operate in New Hampshire, but lacking academic accreditation.
The types listed here are as categorized in the Carnegie Classification of Institutions of Higher Education.
The nine locations are Claremont, Concord, Conway, Lebanon, Littleton, Manchester, Nashua, Portsmouth, and Rochester 
The University of New Hampshire School of Law is in Concord, another branch campus is in Manchester

References

External links
US Department of Education listing of accredited institutions in New Hampshire
List of colleges and universities in New Hampshire viewable in Google Earth

 
New Hampshire
Universities and colleges